Willy Kruyt ( John William Kruyt; 8 September 1877 – July 1943) was a Dutch Protestant minister and Christian socialist, later Communist, politician.

Background
The son of a Dutch publisher and his Scottish wife, Kruyt studied theology at Utrecht and joined the League of Christian Socialists in 1910.

Early political career

In 1913, he was elected chairman of this party; in 1918, he became its only member of the House of Representatives. In the same period, he worked as a Reformed minister at Gennep. He formed an alliance with Willem van Ravesteyn and David Wijnkoop, the two representatives from the Social Democratic Party as well as Harm Kolthek. When, in 1921, the League had disintegrated due to factional struggles between orthodox Protestants and anarchists, Kruyt joined the Communist Party. He stood as a Communist candidate for the 1922 elections, but was not re-elected.

Later career
Following his wife's death, Kruyt emigrated to Berlin where he joined Workers International Relief, then to Moscow in 1935 (presumably fleeing from the Nazis) to work at the Lenin State Library. Dissatisfied with Stalinism, he trained as a spy in the hopes of getting back to the Netherlands this way. From England, he parachuted into Belgium in June 1942. He broke his leg and was arrested by the German occupiers who detained him at Fort Breendonk.

Death
Kruyt was tortured and deported to the Moabit prison in Berlin where he is thought to have been executed by firing squad in July 1943.

References

1877 births
1943 deaths
20th-century Dutch Calvinist and Reformed ministers
Dutch communists
Dutch socialists
Members of the House of Representatives (Netherlands)
Dutch people of Scottish descent
Clergy from Amsterdam
Dutch resistance members
Dutch prisoners of war in World War II
Breendonk prison camp prisoners
Dutch people executed by Nazi Germany
Politicians from Amsterdam
Dutch people executed abroad